is a railway station in Ōita City, Ōita Prefecture, Japan. It is operated by JR Kyushu and is on the Hōhi Main Line.

Lines

Layout 
The station consists of an island platform serving two tracks. The station building is a small modern functional concrete structure which is unstaffed and serves only as a waiting room. Access to the island platform is by means of a level crossing.

Adjacent stations

History
In a further phase of expansion, the track was extended westwards, with Takenaka opening as the new western terminus on 1 September 1916. On 2 December 1928, the entire track from Kumamoto through Takenaka to Ōita was designated as the Hōhi Main Line. With the privatization of Japanese National Railways (JNR), the successor of JGR, on 1 April 1987, the station came under the control of JR Kyushu.

In September 2017, Typhoon Talim (Typhoon 18) damaged the Hōhi Main Line at several locations. Services between Aso and Nakahanda, including Takenaka, were suspended and replaced by bus services. Normal rail services between Aso and Ōita were restored by 2 October 2017.

Passenger statistics
In fiscal 2015, there were a total of 15,632  boarding passengers, giving a daily average of 43 passengers.

See also
List of railway stations in Japan

References

External links
Takenaka (JR Kyushu)

Railway stations in Ōita Prefecture
Railway stations in Japan opened in 1916
Ōita (city)